Pleasant Grove is an unincorporated community in Township 11, Alamance County, North Carolina, United States.

Pleasant Grove is located at the intersection of North Carolina Highway 49 and North Carolina Highway 62 in the northeastern part of Alamance County.

History
A post office operated from 1815 to 1908.

Tobacco crops from nearby farms were processed in Pleasant Grove during the early 20th century.

Pleasant Grove High School was built in 1922 to serve white students in grades eight to ten.  It became an elementary school in 1962, and closed in 1971 to comply with county desegregation requirements.  Parts of the school were later demolished, though the cafeteria/gym wing remained and today function as the Pleasant Grove Community Center.

Notable person 
 JamesOn Curry - NBA player

References 

Unincorporated communities in North Carolina
Unincorporated communities in Alamance County, North Carolina